Gilson College is a dual-campus, independent Seventh-day Adventist co-educational early learning, primary and secondary day school, located in outer western and north-western Melbourne suburbs of  and , Victoria, Australia. The College caters for students from early learning through to Year K to Year 12. The original campus located in Taylors Hill was established in 1988. The second campus in Mernda was acquired in December 2012 and classes began in January 2013. The College is part of the Seventh-day Adventist education system, the world's second largest Christian school system.

History
Gilson College traces its beginnings to the mid 1970s when a primary school was established in the suburb of Pascoe Vale in Melbourne’s north west. At the end of 1987 the Pascoe Vale school was closed and this heralded the beginning of a new educational institution on the current Taylors Road site. It was established in 1988 and originally known as the 'Keilor School'. In 1992, the school council voted to change the school's name to Gilson College as a tribute to W. J. Gilson, a prominent figure in Adventist education in Australia. The growth of the Taylors Hill campus has seen the student enrolment go from around 50 students to now over 1.000.

In 2009 Adventist Schools Victoria closed Ironbark Christian School, which was located in the northern suburbs of Melbourne. In December 2012 a second campus for Gilson College was acquired from the former Acacia College and a similar expansion program is planned for this campus. It caters for Foundation (Prep) to Year 12 (2019) and 2019 is the first year for graduates on the Mernda campus.

Principals 
The following individuals have served as College Principal:

Facilities

The Taylors Hill campus is set on  near Caroline Springs, on the western outskirts of Melbourne. The College has in the past 18 years continued to expand its educational line-up, starting with the Science Wing, Library and E-block of classrooms completed in 2000, IT block and Admin office completed in 2003. In more recent years a six-classroom complex for Years Five and Six has been added to the campus. Each year a building program has added facilities that are now enjoyed by the students and staff. Modern classrooms have been added or renovated. In addition to this, technology laboratories as well as new science facilities provide for the students' needs. A large gymnasium and an eco-science centre are elements of the campus.

The secondary complex is modern and consists of classrooms, science lab, food technology, visual communication room, industrial technology, art room, music and drama rooms. In 2017 work began on the refurbishment and completion of a new middle school facility for the secondary students with classes operating in 2018.

Site developments 
The Taylors Hill campus has recently completed an expansion of the Year Three and Four complex which includes two additional classrooms, offices and the refurbishment of existing facilities. Future developments will include a Performing Arts Theatre and a Pre-school.

The Mernda campus has had a number of minor developments including a canteen, and recently a new middle / senior school complex with library has been opened. Future projects will include the development of the southern portion of the estate and the current secondary area being developed into a community center and kindergarten.

Enrolment 

The College was established due to the parents of the local Adventist churches who wished to raise their children within a Christian environment. Hence, Gilson College was established to support families to raise their children encompassing these Christian values, character and worldviews. The College accepts students who appreciate and respect this Christian ethos and values the opportunities created by attending this school.

Gilson College has significant demand for places, and so each application is assessed to ensure that the College is a suitable fit for the student. Obtaining and submitting an application is the first step in the enrolment process understanding there is no guarantee for admission. The main entry points are Foundation and Year 7, where families are asked to indicate both the proposed calendar year and the school year level of entry for their child. Entry at other year levels is based on enrolment availability. This is usually determined late in Term 2 of the year prior to commencement.

Following application, the next stage in the enrolment process is to be invited to meet with the Principal or Head of Campus for an interview. Consultation with current and/or previous schools, teachers and referees, will take place where applicable, in addition to a National Police Check for all parents or guardians. Academic assessments will be conducted as part of this process. For Foundation students this will include a school readiness assessment at an arranged time. Following these processes, our Enrolments Committee will review each application to determine who will be offered places. Please note, not all applications will receive an offer and some may be placed on a waiting list.

Gilson College is also registered to take international students.

Curriculum 
In 1999, the school first started offering the Victorian Certificate of Education program on the Taylors Hill campus and now offers around 30 subjects.  In the F – 10 years the College follows the Australian Curriculum for the eight learning areas, which focuses on general capabilities and cross-curriculum priorities. In addition to this the College utilises the Encounter program, which uses rigorous pedagogical practice, and 21st century learning strategies, as it explores and develops personal reasons for faith, lifestyle choices, and ethical decision-making from an Adventist worldview, all the while nurturing interpersonal relationships and service to others.

See also

 List of Seventh-day Adventist secondary schools
 List of schools in Victoria
 Seventh-day Adventist education

References

External links

 http://privateschoolsguide.com/gilson-college-taylors-hill-vic/

Private secondary schools in Melbourne
Private primary schools in Melbourne
Adventist secondary schools in Australia
Adventist primary schools in Australia
Educational institutions established in 1988
1988 establishments in Australia
Buildings and structures in the City of Melton
Buildings and structures in the City of Whittlesea